Marcelo Andrés Herrera Mansilla (born 3 November 1998) is an Argentine professional footballer who plays as a right-back for River Plate.

Club career
Herrera started his senior career with San Lorenzo, having had youth spells with Textil Mandiyú, Boca Unidos and Rivadavia. He was selected in the club's senior squad during the 2018–19 Argentine Primera División campaign, with his professional debut arriving on 21 September 2018 during a win over Patronato at the Estadio Pedro Bidegain; he played the full ninety minutes as San Lorenzo won 3–2. Herrera ended 2018–19 with three goals, split across the Primera División, the Copa Argentina and the Copa Libertadores.

International career
In July 2019, Herrera made the Argentina U23s' squad for the Pan American Games in Peru. He made five appearances as Argentina beat Honduras in the final to secure the trophy.

Career statistics
.

Honours
Argentina U23
Pan American Games: 2019
Pre-Olympic Tournament: 2020

References

External links

1998 births
Living people
People from Corrientes
Argentine footballers
Argentina youth international footballers
Footballers at the 2019 Pan American Games
Pan American Games gold medalists for Argentina
Pan American Games medalists in football
Medalists at the 2019 Pan American Games
Olympic footballers of Argentina
Footballers at the 2020 Summer Olympics
Sportspeople from Corrientes Province
Association football defenders
Argentine Primera División players
San Lorenzo de Almagro footballers
Club Atlético River Plate footballers